Hanceville is about 90 km west of Williams Lake in the Chilcotin District of the Central Interior of British Columbia, Canada.  It is the main community of the Stone First Nation band.  It is located southeast of Alexis Creek, on the north side of the Chilcotin River.

References

Populated places in the Chilcotin
Unincorporated settlements in British Columbia
Tsilhqot'in communities